Woke on a Whaleheart is the first record released by Bill Callahan under his own name instead of his nom de plume Smog. It was released by Drag City on April 24, 2007, and released a week earlier in Callahan's home state of Texas. A single, "Diamond Dancer," preceded the release of the album on March 20, 2007.

The arrangements of labelmate and former Royal Trux vocalist and guitarist Neil Michael Hagerty are featured on the album, and Callahan's band consists of vocalist Deani Pugh-Flemmings, guitarist Pete Denton, violinist Elizabeth Warren, percussionist Thor Harris, bassist Steve Bernal, and keyboard/lap steel player Howard Draper. The album was recorded by Jeremy Lemos, who previously recorded the Smog albums Rain on Lens and Supper. Woke on a Whaleheart's sound, according to Callahan, touches upon "gospel, tough pop and American Light Opera."

Joe Grillo of the art collective Dearraindrop created the album artwork.

Track listing
All songs written by Bill Callahan.
 "From the Rivers to the Ocean" – 6:35
 "Footprints" – 2:47
 "Diamond Dancer" – 4:00
 "Sycamore" – 5:35
 "The Wheel" – 4:03
 "Honeymoon Child" – 4:40
 "Day" – 4:32
 "Night" – 3:04
 "A Man Needs a Woman or a Man to Be a Man" – 5:13

External links
 Woke On A Whaleheart recording session photos

Notes

2007 albums
Bill Callahan (musician) albums
Drag City (record label) albums